Micropodia is a genus of fungi in the family Helotiaceae; according to the 2007 Outline of Ascomycota, the placement in this family is uncertain. The genus contains 1 or 2 species.

References

Helotiaceae